The 2021 Women's EuroHockey Championship III was the ninth edition of the Women's EuroHockey Championship III, the third level of the women's European field hockey championships organized by the European Hockey Federation. It was held from 1 to 7 August 2021 at HC Lipovci in Lipovci, Slovenia.

Ukraine won their first EuroHockey Championship III title by defeating Switzerland 2–1. Turkey won the bronze medal by defeating Croatia 3–0.

Qualified teams
Participating nations have qualified based on their final ranking from the 2019 competition.

Umpires
The following eight umpires were appointed for the tournament by the EHF:

Preliminary round

Pool A

Pool B

Fifth to seventh place classification

Pool C
The points obtained in the preliminary round against the other team are taken over.

First to fourth place classification

Bracket

Semi-finals

Third place game

Final

Statistics

Final standings

Goalscorers

See also
2021 Men's EuroHockey Championship III
2021 Women's EuroHockey Championship II

Notes

References

Women's EuroHockey Championship III
Women 3
EuroHockey Championship III
International women's field hockey competitions hosted by Slovenia
EuroHockey Championship III
EuroHockey Championship III